Moree  is a town in Moree Plains Shire in northern New South Wales, Australia. It is located on the banks of the Mehi River, in the centre of the rich black-soil plains. The town is located at the junction of the Newell Highway and Gwydir Highway and can be reached by daily train and air services from Sydney.

The Weraerai and Kamilaroi peoples are the earliest known inhabitants of the area, and the town's name is said to come from an Aboriginal word for "rising sun," "long spring," or "water hole". The town was settled by Europeans in the 1850s, and local Aboriginal residents were placed in missions, later Aboriginal reserves.

The town, and in particular the Moree Baths and Swimming Pool, are known for being visited by the group of activists on the famous 1965 Freedom Ride, an historic trip through northern NSW led by Charles Perkins to bring media attention to discrimination against Indigenous Australians.   

Moree is a major agricultural centre, noted for its part in the Australian cotton-growing industry which was established there in the early 1960s.  It is situated in the Moree Plains Shire. Moree is home to artesian hot spring baths which are famous for their reputed healing qualities.

At the 2021 census, the town of Moree had a population of 7,070.

History

Before colonisation
The Weraerai and Kamilaroi peoples, whose descendants are still in the town, were the earliest known inhabitants of the area.

European settlement
Major Thomas Mitchell went to the district at the request of the acting governor after the recapture of escaped convict George Clarke who told of a great river called the Kindur in 1832. Clarke had been living in the area to the south with the Kamilaroi from 1826 to 1831. Squatters soon followed in Mitchell's wake establishing pastoral runs, among which was 'Moree' (1844), from a Kamilaroi term believed to mean either "long waterhole", "rising sun", or "long spring".

There was ongoing between the colonists and Aboriginal peoples from the late 1830s, which resulted in the murder of hundreds of Aboriginal people, although (as of February 2021) no massacres have been recorded. There were also many deaths caused indirectly, through the introduction of new diseases, displacement, and lack of access to life-sustaining resources,as their water holes and hunting grounds were taken over by pastoralists. This led poaching of livestock, and subsequent bouts of retribution from settlers and retaliation by the Aboriginal groups. The impact on the local Aboriginal people continues to the present day.

In 1851 James and Mary Brand arrived and built a general store on the banks of the river in 1852. A post office was added the following year. The family sold up and moved to the Hunter Region in 1857 but James died in 1858 leaving Mary with six children so she returned opened another business and in 1861 she opened the town's first inn.

Moree was gazetted as a town in 1862, with land sales proceeding that year. 

A court of petty sessions was established in 1863, and there was a severe flood in 1864. The first constable arrived and a police station was set up in 1865. The first church (Wesleyan) was built in 1867 when the town had a population of 43.

As closer settlement proceeded agriculture emerged as a thriving industry on the fertile flood plains. Banking began in 1876 and the first local newspaper was set up in 1881, at which time the population was 295.

The town became a municipality in 1890. During 1894 construction of the heritage listed Federation-style lands office commenced and ended that years with the completion of the ground floor. The second storey was added in 1903. In 1895 the Great Artesian Basin which sits under Moree was tapped and yields over thirteen megalitres of water every day. The railway line and service from Sydney arrived in 1897.

Wheat cultivation increased after World War II with a flour mill built at Moree in 1951 and the first commercial pecan nut farm was established on the Gwydir Highway east of Moree in 1966. The Trawalla Pecan Nut Farm is the largest pecan nut farm in the southern hemisphere, growing about 75,000 trees. In 1994 the Gwydir Olive Grove Company was established when two Moree families started producing olive oil from olives grown in the area.

Moree was one of the destinations of the famous 1965 Freedom Bus ride, an historic trip through northern NSW led by Charles Perkins to bring media attention to discrimination against Indigenous Australians.  It brought racial segregation in rural Australia to the attention of urban Australians, in particular at the Moree Baths and Swimming Pool as well as pubs and theatres, where Aboriginal people were refused entry. At the Moree swimming pool, after a confrontation with the council and pool management, it was agreed that indigenous children could swim in the pool outside school hours.

Aboriginal missions and reserves
After the establishment of the Aboriginal Protection Board (APB) in 1883, Aboriginal reserves were developed. The Aborigines Protection Act 1909 enabled  forced removals children from the reserves, which led to fringe camps around the town.

Moree Mission Aboriginal School existed there around 1933.

Aboriginal people moved from the Terry Hie Hie reserve, south-east of Moree, in the early 1920s to escape the forced removals of Aboriginal and "half-caste" children from their families by the APB. They created an informal settlement at Moree known as Top Camp, which existed until 1967. Steel Bridge Camp and Top Camp were both associated with Terry Hie Hie.

Middle Camp was established on the other sided of town, next to the Mehi River, and Bottom Camp further downstream. This latter camp was enlarged into a station known as Mehi Crescent Reserve or Mehi Mission in 1953.

"Moree Aborgines' Station" was in 1953 described as "a little over two miles west of the town on the left bank of the Mehi". C. F. Boughton, in an article in the North West Champion, describes what the New South Wales Aborigines Welfare Board was doing in its 19 Aboriginal reserves for "the uplift and welfare of the aborigines in this district". The station was then managed by a Mr E. Morgan. There was a school with a headmaster and two assistants. Cookery and sewing were taught to the girls. There were 118 students at the school, and some were brought by bus from nearby camps. The residents had formed a Progressive Association in 1951, and they had a public address system and football club which played in the district competition. The manager's wife ran a girl guides troop and there was a boys' club.

An Aboriginal reserve was declared on 17 July 1970 (effective 21 August 1970), and revoked on 20 September 1974. There were also other reserves and places of Aboriginal significance at nearby at Terry Hie Hie, and one called Wirajarai  on the Gwydir River.

21st century

In 2007 the Moree Plains Council announced plans for a $14m upgrade to the hot thermal baths.

Heritage-listed sites 
 Commercial Banking Company of Sydney building (former)
 Commonwealth Bank (former)
 Mellor House
 Moree Club
 Moree Courthouse
 Moree Lands Office
 Anne Street: Moree Baths and Swimming Pool
 Moree Spa Baths
 Victoria Hotel Moree

The Steel Bridge Aboriginal Campsite is a site of moderate to high Aboriginal cultural and social significance, and,  outside the town, Gamilaroi Nature Reserve and Terry Hie Hie reserve are also of cultural and historical significance to Aboriginal people.

Demographics
In the 2021 Australian census, there were 7,070 people registered in the town. Of these, nearly a quarter identified as Aboriginal and/or Torres Strait Islander. Around 70 per cent of the population were Australian-born.

Tourism and culture
Moree is home to artesian hot spring baths which are famous for their reputed healing qualities.

BAMM: Bank Art Museum Moree, until 2018 known as Moree Plains Gallery, holds a significant collection of Aboriginal art. It was established and run by Moree Plains Shire Council until 2018, when the Moree Cultural Art Foundation took over management of the gallery. It holds a series of photographs of people from the two Moree missions, called A common place: Portraits of Moree Murries, created in 1990 by Michael Riley, whose mother grew up on one of the missions.

Climate
Moree experiences a humid subtropical climate (Köppen Cfa) with slight semi arid influence. In summer temperatures above  are common while in winter temperatures below  are also common. Typical of humid subtropical climates rainfall is more common in summer than in winter.

Flooding

20th century
In January 1910 floods in the Moree district caused numerous washouts of the railway to Moree. An unknown number of livestock were drowned, and at least four people drowned in the Moree area.

In January 1946 a flood cut the township in two, and several hundred homes were flooded. The flood waters affected the local power station which caused a blackout. The floods also damaged roads and railway lines in the region. The Gwydir River bridge at Moree was also damaged.

Most of the central business district of the town and 800 homes were flooded.

Four hundred people were evacuated and the township was isolated for two weeks.

Nearly three quarters of the buildings in north Moree either had floodwater surrounding them or water in them, which included the central business district.

21st century
In February 2001, another major flood peak was recorded in Moree. There were a few houses with over floor flooding. Before the flood, nearly  fell at Moree Airport within 48 hours.

People were urged to evacuate from parts of north Moree and houses were flooded. Nearly  of rain was recorded over 72 hours with  falling in the final 24 hours of rainfall. Moree and numerous other shires were declared natural disaster zones.

In February 2012, major flooding again occurred in Moree. Nearly the whole of north Moree had water in the streets with just a few still out. The whole of north Moree was told to evacuate the day before the flood peak including the nearby villages of Yarraman, Gwydirfield, Bendygleet, Pallamallawa and Biniguy. Some of the lower parts of south Moree became inundated with flooding. All of north Moree were urged to evacuate as it was expected then to be the worst flooding in 35 years. No fatalities were recorded. Nearly  of rain was recorded at the Moree Meteorological Station in the 72 hours before the flood.

Flood levels on the Mehi river reached  on 25 of March.

This was part of an event that has seen major flood levels state wide.

Sports
The most popular sport in Moree by a wide margin is rugby league. There are two rugby league teams from the town, the Moree Boars of Group 4, and the famous Aboriginal team the Moree Boomerangs of Group 19. The teams play at Boughton Oval and Burt Jovanovich Oval respectively, often in front of many spectators.

Rugby League Teams in Moree
 Moree Boars (Group 4)
 Moree Boomerangs (Group 19)

Other sports teams include the Narrabri Eagles/Moree Suns who play in AFL North West and Moree Weebolla Bulls RUFC.

Media
Moree is served by the Moree Champion newspaper, owned by Rural Press, which is published on Tuesdays and Thursdays.

Radio stations 2VM and 98.3 NOW FM also broadcast from Moree. The NOW FM transmitter site is located on Mt Dowe, whilst the 2VM transmitter is located 5 kilometres east of Moree on the Gwydir Highway. Both stations are owned by the Broadcast Operations Group and broadcast weekday breakfast and afternoon programs.

Prime Television's Tamworth station also had a news bureau in Moree, but it was closed down in 2000 due to budget deficiencies.

The closest television networks shown in Moree are PRIME7, 9NBN and WIN Television and they get broadcast from Tamworth.

Transport

Moree Airport is served by regional airline Fly Corporate with regular services to and from Brisbane as well as regular Qantas airline services to Sydney. The now defunct Brindabella Airlines provided a service to and from Brisbane up until 27 January 2012.

Moree railway station is situated on the Mungindi line,  from Sydney. The station opened in 1897 and currently marks the northernmost point of passenger services on the line, a daily NSW TrainLink Xplorer DMU to and from Sydney.

NSW TrainLink operate a coach service from Moree to Grafton. Crisps Coaches operate a coach service from Moree to Warwick with connections to Brisbane and Toowoomba.

Notable people

 Mary Brand (1827–1900), first female shopkeeper and first hotelier in Moree; commemorated by the town's Mary Brand Park, which had a replica of her shop and house until they burned down in 2012 She is buried in the Moree Cemetery.
 Edward Bulwer Lytton Dickens (1852–1902), youngest child of English author Charles Dickens; emigrated to Australia, living in Moree; member of parliament for Wilcannia; buried in Moree cemetery
 Gail Garvey, indigenous Australian epidemiological oncologist; from a Moree family
 Mary Gaudron, first female Justice of the High Court of Australia
 Cameron Hammond, first aboriginal person from Moree to go to the Commonwealth Games (Delhi 2010), where he boxed in the welterweight division In March 2012, he qualified for the 2012 Summer Olympics in London.
 Van Humphries, Australian rugby union player; grew up in Moree
 Ewan McGrady, Australian rugby league player
 Emma Moffatt, triathlete; two-time world champion (2009 and 2010), 3rd at the Beijing Olympic Games 2008, 6th at the 2016 Rio Olympics and olympian at the 2012 London Olympics
 Carmine Munro, an Aboriginal elder
Lyall Munro Snr, husband of Carmine, Aboriginal leader
Lyall Munro Jnr, son of Carmine and Lyall Snr, Aboriginal activist and leader
 Michael Riley (1960–2004), artist and filmmaker, whose mother was born in Moree, created a series of photographs in 1990 called A common place: Portraits of Moree Murries, held by BAMM
 Matthew Ryan, Australian rugby league player
 David Stove, philosopher and essayist; born in Moree in 1927
 Peter Taylor, retired from the Australian cricket team; now lives in Moree
 Tony Taylor (GC), vulcanologist; one of only five Australian civilians directly awarded the George Cross; born in Moree 30 October 1917
 John Williamson, country music singer-songwriter; has strong roots in Moree; his mother and a large part of his extended family still live there
 Mark Wright  (1955−2017), professional rugby league player for the Newcastle Jets, born in Moree

Gallery

References

Further reading

External links

 
Towns in New South Wales
North West Slopes
Newell Highway
1862 establishments in Australia
Hot springs of Australia